Menace Beach is a video game that was released for the Nintendo Entertainment System by Color Dreams in 1990. Like all Color Dreams games, Menace Beach was not officially licensed by Nintendo. It was also re-released as part of the Maxivision 15-in-1 multicart.

Gameplay
According to the game's instruction manual, the player controls a skateboarding hero whose girlfriend, Bunny, has been kidnapped by Demon Dan. An introduction screen shows a shackled Bunny pleading for the player's help. In the game, the hero must use his skateboard and any objects he finds, such as balloons, frogs, bombs and bottles, to defeat ninjas, clowns and disgruntled dock workers before finally confronting the villainous Demon Dan. The game was somewhat infamous because in-between levels the girlfriend's clothes "rot" away, by when the first level is completed, parts of her clothes rot away until the girl is in nothing else but in her bra and panties.

Sunday Funday

Menace Beach was later redesigned with a Christian theme and released by Color Dreams' Wisdom Tree label as Sunday Funday in 1995, the last game released for the NES in North America. According to the game's instruction manual, the player controls a skateboarding hero who is late for Sunday school. In the game, the hero must use his skateboard and any objects he finds, such as balloons, grapefruits and newspapers, to defeat bullies, clowns and businessmen who are attempting to impede his path to Sunday school.

The hero carries a Bible in Sunday Funday, but not in Menace Beach. The hero's girlfriend from Menace Beach is replaced by a fully clothed Sunday school teacher.

The game cartridge included two features other than the game itself — an arcade-style puzzle game titled Fish Fall, a rendition of an unreleased Color Dreams game called Free Fall which was interspersed with Bible verses, and a sing-along of "The Ride", a song by Christian pop band 4Him.

The music is also different during the gameplay. Some of the graphics and level backgrounds were changed as well.

Sources

 Instruction Manual

External links

1990 video games
1995 video games
Christian video games
Side-scrolling video games
Nintendo Entertainment System games
Nintendo Entertainment System-only games
Unauthorized video games
Color Dreams games
Video games developed in the United States
Single-player video games
Obscenity controversies in video games